Daphne genkwa is a deciduous shrub and one of the 50 fundamental herbs used in traditional Chinese medicine, where it has the name yuán huā.

The plant was discovered by the prolific British plant collector Charles Maries (1851-1902).

Subspecies
In addition to the nominate subspecies, Daphne genkwa subsp. genkwa, two further subspecies are recognized. Both are treated as separate species by the Flora of China.

Daphne genkwa subsp. jinzhaiensis (D.C.Zhang & J.Z.Shao) Halda (syn. Daphne jinzhaiensis) differs from subsp. genkwa in its terminal 3–5-flowered racemes, each flower having a tube 10–12 mm long. It is found in Anhui, China.

Daphne genkwa subsp. leishanensis (H.F.Zhou ex C.Yung Chang) Halda (syn. Daphne leishanensis) differs from subsp. genkwa having blackish-purple older branches and reddish flowers 6–7 mm long. It is found in Guizhou, China, where it grows on rocky slopes with bushes at altitudes ranging from 900 to 1200 m.

See also
Chinese herbology#50 fundamental herbs

References

External links
Daphne genkwa List of Chemicals (Dr. Duke's Databases)

genkwa
Plants used in traditional Chinese medicine